Donald Archibald (August 16, 1840 – September 1908) was a farmer and political figure in Nova Scotia. He represented Halifax County in the Nova Scotia House of Assembly from 1871 to 1878 as a Liberal member.

He was born in Musquodoboit, Nova Scotia, the son of Matthew Archibald and Jane Grant, and worked on the family farm for seven years after leaving school at the age of thirteen. Archibald spent two years prospecting for gold in the province before purchasing his own farm. In 1865, he married Grizell McLachlan. He was named a justice of the peace and served on the council for Halifax County, being chosen as county warden in 1881. He was unsuccessful in a bid for reelection to the provincial assembly in 1878. He died in Halifax at the age of 68. He was high sheriff at the time of his death.

References 

1840 births
1908 deaths
Nova Scotia Liberal Party MLAs